Ida Swinburne was a British documentary film producer and Liberal Party politician.

Background
Ida Swinburne was born in Paddington, London, the eldest daughter of Sir James Swinburne, 9th Baronet, F.R.S., of Inverness-shire and Lilian Gilchrist Carey. She had two older half-brothers, Anthony Swinburne and Spearman Charles Swinburne and a younger sister, Marjorie Swinburne. She lived with her parents in East Surrey for 20 years. She was educated at Irwin House and the Manor House, Limpsfield. In July 1929 she married Douglas Ronald Spen Steuart. They moved to Bramham Gardens, in South West London. They divorced in 1945. She then married in July 1945, Cmdr. Daniel Harvey Rainier, DSC, RN. They lived at Strone, North Knapdale by Lochgilphead, Argyllshire. He died in March 1965 and she died the following year.

Political career
In 1928 Ida Swinburne was a Liberal London County Council candidate for Camberwell North West. She was unsuccessful. She was selected as prospective Liberal parliamentary candidate for the safe Conservative seat of East Surrey in March 1929, a constituency that the Liberals had not contested at the previous election. The General Election was almost immediately called and she had only two months to put her case across. Although she had previously lived in the constituency for 20 years, she had little opportunity to build a local profile. She highlighted her interest in industrial questions, free trade and education. She achieved a respectable second place vote, pushing the Labour candidate into third place. She was re-adopted as prospective Liberal candidate for East Surrey in 1930. She remained Liberal candidate until withdrawing in October 1931 due to the formation of the National Government. She did not stand for parliament again. She continued to be active in the Liberal Party and was a member of the national executive of the Women's Liberal Federation. She was also a member of the Eighty Club.

Electoral record

Professional career
With her husband Ronald, Ida Steuart created Steuart Films. They produced a number of documentary films in the 1930s. She served in World War II as a 1st Officer in the Women's Royal Naval Service.

References

1899 births
1966 deaths
Liberal Party (UK) parliamentary candidates
Royal Navy personnel of World War II
Daughters of baronets
Women's Royal Naval Service officers